Ethmia stephenrumseyi is a moth in the family Depressariidae.

The ground color of the forewings is white with well defined black markings. There is an elongated blotch at costal half, interrupted by a white patch . There is a short oblique band in the terminal area and a broad oblique irregular band from the middle of forewing, reaching the posterior margin. The hindwing ground colour is whitish, becoming dark grey towards the apex.

Etymology
The species is named in honor of Stephen Rumsey for his use of forest conservation and recuperation to reverse climate alteration by humans and to increase biodiversity in the wild.

References

Moths described in 2014
stephenrumseyi